Seufert is a surname. Notable people with the surname include:

Christina Seufert (born 1957), American diver
Christopher Seufert (born 1967), American documentary film producer and director
Michael Seufert (born 1983), Portuguese politician
Nils Seufert (born 1997), German footballer